Somewhere Else is the third studio album by American musician Lydia Loveless. It was released on February 18, 2014, by Bloodshot Records.

Somewhere Else was recorded with the same musicians that have extensively toured with Loveless. The album was recorded in two days and was produced by Loveless and engineer Joe Viers at Sonic Lounge in Columbus, Ohio.

Songwriting 
Loveless scrapped an entire records' worth of songs before beginning this record. The title track, "Somewhere Else," was written while at SXSW. "Really Wanna See You" was written at Loveless' husband's grandmother's house. Loveless said she used layered guitars on the song to convey an electronica feel.

“Hurts So Bad” was inspired by the tempestuous relationship between Elizabeth Taylor and Richard Burton. The song "Head" was co-written with Todd May, who plays guitar in Loveless' band. Loveless said the song went through multiple versions and took a long time to write.

"Verlaine Shot Rimbaud" was featured on a "Special Valentine's Day Edition" of NPR's Morning Edition Heavy Rotation series. It was also featured as a Rolling Stone "Daily Download." The song is about the 19th-century French poets Paul Verlaine and Arthur Rimbaud.

Album artwork 
The album has a quote from Verlaine's 'Aspiration' inside the cover. The album artwork was created by the Columbus, Ohio-based branding and design agency Blackletter.

Reception 

The album had an overwhelmingly good reception and entered Billboard's Heatseekers chart (new entries to Billboard charts, compiled by Nielsen SoundScan) the first week of its release at position number 7.

Paste describes the record as "an album of blood and guts and emotions—anger and yearning and lust—that are so honest and immediate that they beg to be shared. The strength in Loveless’ vocals is how deftly she moves between tough and vulnerable, the emotions in both realms sincere and familiar." Mark Deming from AllMusic notes Loveless "has developed an uncanny ability to talk about matters of the heart and soul with a lyrical voice that's graceful, keenly observed, and brutally honest."

Track listing

Bonus tracks 
 "Falling Out of Love With You" - iTunes bonus track
 "Come Over" - vinyl bonus track, available via download code with purchase of vinyl
 "Blind" - 7" Record Store Day bonus tracks: Limited edition on lime green vinyl. The B-side is an exclusive Ke$ha cover. The tracks were released in digital album format May 27, 2014.

Personnel 
Band
 Lydia Loveless – vocals, guitar
 Todd May – guitar, vocals
 Ben Lamb – upright bass
 Nick German – drums

Additional musicians
 Jay Gasper – steel guitar
 Nate Holman – keyboards

References

Lydia Loveless albums
Bloodshot Records albums
2014 albums